Lindsey Paige Pluimer (born July 3, 1986) is an American former professional basketball player. After her retirement she started the nonprofit organization, With My Own Two Hands Foundation which provides clean water and sustainable agriculture projects in East Africa.

College
When Pluimer left UCLA, she was the twelfth all-time leading scorer and tenth all-time leading rebounder in the school's women's basketball history. She was also the first UCLA Bruin in the NCAA era to start in every game she played in.

UCLA  statistics
Source

WNBA
Pluimer was selected in the 2008 WNBA Draft by the Washington Mystics. When she was drafted she reunited with her former UCLA teammate Nikki Blue.

References

External links
UCLA Bruins bio

1986 births
Living people
American women's basketball players
Basketball players from California
Forwards (basketball)
McDonald's High School All-Americans
Parade High School All-Americans (girls' basketball)
People from Lakewood, California
UCLA Bruins women's basketball players
Washington Mystics draft picks